Beer in Japan mostly comes from the country's four major breweries, Asahi, Kirin, Sapporo and Suntory, which mainly produce pale lagers around 5% ABV. Beer is immensely popular, far ahead of sake consumption.

As well as Pilsner style lagers, the most commonly produced beer style in Japan, beer-like beverages made with lower levels of malt, called happoshu (literally, "bubbly alcohol") or non-malt , have captured a large part of the market, as tax is substantially lower on these products.

Microbreweries have also become increasing popular since deregulation in 1994, supplying distinct tasting beers in a variety of styles that seek to match the emphasis on craftsmanship, quality, and ingredient provenance often associated with Japanese food.

Craft beer bars and pubs are also popular in Japan's major cities, with Tokyo and Osaka having vibrant craft beer scenes, generally with a focus on locally produced and imported beers from the US and Europe. In 2014, Kirin entered the craft beer market with the launch of a wholly owned subsidiary, Spring Valley Brewing, and two brewpubs in Daikanyama, Tokyo, and Namamugi, Yokohama, which opened in 2015. Industrial brewery Sapporo also released a craft line in 2015.

History
Although the tradition of sake brewing long pre-dates European contact, beer is thought to have been first introduced to Japan in the 17th century during the Edo period by Dutch traders. However, beer was not widely available until the end of the 19th century, with the signing of the Treaty of Kanagawa in 1854 opening Japan to foreign trade.

As Japan reopened to foreign trade during the Meiji period, imported beers such as Bass Pale Ale and Bass Stout were available in limited quantities in the foreign settlements, but trained brewers from Europe and elsewhere also arrived to contribute to the growth of the local industry.

The brewery that would become Kirin Brewery Company began in Yokohama in late 1869 as the Spring Valley Brewery, a private business established by Norwegian-American, William Copeland. The Sapporo Brewery was founded in 1876 as a part of a government-directed development plan for Hokkaido. Asahi Breweries traces its founding heritage to the start of the Osaka Beer Brewing Company in 1889, and the launch of the Asahi Beer brand in 1892.

Market size
Beer (and beer-like happoshu) are the most popular alcoholic drink in Japan, accounting for nearly two thirds of the 9 billion liters of alcohol consumed in 2006.

Japan's domestic consumption of the total 187.37 million kiloliter global beer market in 2012 was about 5.55 million kiloliters or about 3.0%. This statistic for total beer consumption in Japan also includes the beer-like happoshu.

In terms of national per capita beer consumption Japan ranked 51st in 2014, equivalent to 42.6 liters per person, reflecting the diversified alcoholic and non-alcoholic beverage market enjoyed by Japanese consumers. Demographic factors are expected to continue to push down sales of mass-market beer products in Japan for the foreseeable future as younger consumers are drinking less beer than previous generations. For the calendar year 2013, overall shipments for Japan's five largest brewers were 433.57 million cases, (a case is equivalent to 12.66 liters of beer or 27 US pints) more than 20% off the market peak achieved in 1992.

However, for locally produced craft beers accounting for less than 1% of domestic beer consumption and selected premium imported beers, market opportunities continue to expand. According to local market data, in the first eight months of 2012, shipments of domestic craft beer rose 7.7 percent while sales by Japan's largest brewers continued a year on year decline.

As of January 2014, Asahi, with a 38% market share, was the largest of the four major beer producers in Japan followed by Kirin with 35% and Suntory with 15%.

Beer vs. happoshu

Brewed alcoholic beverages in Japan are labelled and taxed according to their malt content (i.e., amount of alcohol derived from malted grains): legally,  must have at least 50% malt, while beverages with less malt are collectively called .

Happoshu (also translated as "low-malt beer") is taxed less than beer, and thus has appeal to the consumer. To replace the highly taxed malt, brewers have developed innovative sources of starch and sugar to be fermented into alcohol not commonly used as brewing adjuncts elsewhere, including soy peptides and pea protein.

A tax law revision that went into effect in 2018 lowered the malt requirement for the beer category, allowed more ingredients in beer, and introduced a plan to have beer and happoshu taxed at the same rates in 2026. This erosion of happoshu favorable tax rate "may in the long run favor traditional beer". Before 2018, the beer requirement was 67% malt.

Major beer producers
Asahi Breweries
Kirin Company
Sapporo Brewery
Suntory
Orion Breweries

Dry Wars
The Dry Senso or ドライ戦争 (どらいせんそう, dorai sensō) meaning Dry Wars, was a period of intense competition between Japanese brewery companies over dry beer. It began in 1987 with the launch of Asahi Super Dry by Asahi Breweries which led to the introduction of dry beer by other breweries.

The Kirin Brewery Company, which held 50% share of the Japanese domestic beer market, launched Kirin Dry in February 1988 in an advertising campaign featuring actor Gene Hackman, and in April of the same year launched the all-malt Kirin Malt Dry. However, they were unable to stop Asahi's momentum. In 1990 Kirin launched Ichiban Shibori in direct competition with Asahi Super Dry, but ended up cannibalising profits on their own Kirin Lager Beer brand. Kirin never ended up regaining its 50% market share.

Sapporo Breweries launched the doomed Sapporo Dry in February 1988, and in May 1989 rebranded their flagship product Sapporo Black Label as Sapporo Draft to an unfavourable reception. Production of Sapporo Dry and Sapporo Draft was halted less than two years after their respective launches, and Sapporo Draft later returned to being Black Label.

Suntory launched their Malts brand in February 1988 in an "I don't do dry" campaign, while at the same time launching Suntory Dry, later rebranded Suntory Dry 5.5 in an advertising campaign featuring boxer Mike Tyson after increasing the alcohol content from 5% to 5.5%. This achieved reasonable results, although not enough to slow down demand of Asahi Super Dry.

The Dry Wars were criticised in an episode of the manga Oishinbo (the Gourmet), published at around the same time.

Seasonal beers
Many breweries in Japan offer seasonal beers. In autumn, for instance, "autumn beers" are brewed with a higher alcohol content, typically 6% as opposed to the common 5% of Asahi Super Dry. For example, Kirin's Akiaji beer. The beer cans are typically decorated with pictures of autumn leaves, and the beers are advertised as being suitable for drinking with nabemono (one-pot cooking). Similarly, in winter, beers such as 冬物語 or Fuyu Monogatari (ふゆものがたり, translated as "The Winter's Tale" on the can) appear.

Microbreweries
In 1994, Japan's strict tax laws were relaxed allowing smaller breweries producing 60,000 litres (15,850 gal) per year for a beer license or 6000 litres per year for a happoshu license. Before this change, breweries could not get a license without producing at least 2 million litres (528,000 gal) per year. As a result, a number of smaller breweries have been established throughout Japan.

There are currently over 200 microbreweries in Japan, although many in this number are financially tied to larger sake producers, restaurant chains, resort hotels or similar. Microbreweries in Japan produce various styles of beer including ales, IPAs, stout, pilsner, weissbier, kölsch, fruit beers and others. After the relaxation of the Liquor Tax Law in 1994, there was an initial boom in microbrewing, but the quality of regional microbrews were often mixed and initial consumer enthusiasm leveled off. The popularity of low-cost happoshu (low-malt beer), compared to the high cost microbrews, forced a number of early microbreweries out of business. The dominance of the major industrial brewers and the relative high cost and low volume involved in producing micros led to their only being known to a small number of beer enthusiasts.

In the 2000s however, thanks to factors such as licensed production for some bar and restaurant chains, cooperation between micro breweries, and a more educated consumer base, craft beer has seen a more sustained rise in domestic demand. Improved product quality, word of mouth marketing facilitated by social media websites, the attention given to the rise of US-based craft brewing industry and the growth of independent craft beer retail outlets in major cities, have all contributed to the recent success enjoyed by Japanese craft brewers.

Today there are a growing number of regional microbrew festivals held throughout Japan, including the Great Japan Beer Festival series held annually in Tokyo, Osaka, Nagoya and Yokohama. Every year, the Japan Craft Beer Association holds the Japan Beer Cup, while a competing organization, Japan Craft Beer Support, has launched the annual Nippon Craft Beer Festival.

Notable microbreweries
Kiuchi Brewery
Yo-Ho Brewing

Methods of distribution

Other than in serviced restaurants and bars, in Japan beer can be purchased at a wide variety of outlets, including supermarkets, convenience stores, and kiosks at train stations. Beer can also be sold in vending machines although, as of 2012, this has become much less common in major cities. Some vending machines have motion activated advertising that displays on small TV screens embedded into them. They play beer commercials and jingles that are seen on TV and heard on the radio. These vending machines began to be phased out in June 2000, mainly over concerns of underage drinking.

Drinking culture
The legal drinking age in Japan is 20 years old. In terms of drinking culture, beer drinking and opening formal toasts with beer, as a part of a group, sports team or after-work corporate social bonding activity, is widespread.

Beer can legally be consumed almost anywhere in public, with notable exceptions for organized events, summer festivals and spring cherry blossom parties. Social convention means that open consumption of alcohol on the street or ordinary commuter trains is rare. Japan has very strict laws against operating a motor vehicle or riding a bicycle during or after the consumption of alcohol. Fines, prison time and other penalties can also apply to individuals deemed responsible for supplying alcohol to an intoxicated driver and those traveling in the same vehicle.

Japanese beers available outside Japan 
Japanese-style commercial brewing and beer products have been successfully exported worldwide or are produced locally under license and are distributed in a number of overseas markets.
 In the US, three of the four major Japanese brands are available. These include Sapporo Draft, Kirin Ichiban (Number One, as opposed to the normal Lager which is not available), and Asahi Super Dry. Asahi is produced by Molson in Canada, Kirin is produced at Anheuser-Busch facilities in Williamsburg, Virginia and Los Angeles, and Sapporo is produced at a Sapporo-owned brewery in Guelph, Ontario, Canada. Suntory beer is not available. Orion Beer is also available, imported from Okinawa Prefecture. Availability of brands depends on an individual state's liquor laws, resulting in some beers being available in some places and others not. For example, in Oklahoma, Asahi Super Dry, Sapporo, and Orion are available, whereas in Texas, Kirin Ichiban is prevalent.

Kiuchi brewery was the first Japanese microbrewery to export beer from Japan. Many other Japanese microbreweries now export to North America, Europe, Australia, Singapore, and Hong Kong.

Homebrewing
Although it is technically illegal in Japan to produce beverages containing more than 1% alcohol without a license, the law is rarely adhered to for homebrewers, and homebrewing supplies are available from high street stores and websites.

See also

 Beer and breweries by region
 Happoshu

References

External links

 Directory of Japanese Brewers (RateBeer.com)